All My Relations is a podcast about the Indigenous peoples of the Americas.

Background 
The show is hosted by Matika Wilbur, Desi Small-Rodriguez and Adrienne Keene. The show discusses the Native American mascot controversy. The show discusses Columbus Day and Indigenous People's Day. Matika Wilbur is from the Tulalip and Swinomish peoples and Adrienne Keene is a citizen of the Cherokee Nation. The show is an interview based podcast. The show discusses race and racism. The show discusses Indigenous Food Sovereignty.

Reception 
The A.V. Club included the show on their list of "The best podcasts of 2019 so far". Polygon included the show on their list of "The best podcasts of 2019 (so far)". The Handbook included the show on their list of "The Best Podcasts of 2019". Marie Claire included the show on their list of "The Best New Podcasts of 2019". Fortune included the show on their list of "The Must-Listen Podcasts on Race and History". The Toronto Star included the show among their "Favourite Indigenous Podcasts". Vanity Fair included the show on their list of the "Seven Essential Listens From the Indigenous Podcasting Boom".

All My Relations was an honoree in the 2020 and 2021 Webby Awards.

See also 

 List of Native American podcasts

References

External links 

2019 podcast debuts
Audio podcasts
Political podcasts
Interview podcasts
American podcasts
Native American podcasts